Mohammed Saeed Al-Hammadi (Arabic:محمد سعيد الحمادي) (born 9 April 1995) is an Emirati footballer. He currently plays for Emirates Club as a winger.

References

External links
 

Emirati footballers
1995 births
Living people
Ras Al Khaimah Club players
Emirates Club players
Al Hamriyah Club players
Dibba Al-Hisn Sports Club players
Place of birth missing (living people)
UAE First Division League players
UAE Pro League players
Association football wingers